The 2018 Tour of Mediterrennean was the 1st edition of the Tour of Mediterrennean road cycling stage race. It was part of UCI Europe Tour in category 2.2.

Teams
Eighteen teams were invited to take part in the race. These included seventeen UCI Continental teams and one national team.

Route

Stages

Stage 1
2 March 2018 — Antakya to Adana,

Stage 2
3 March 2018 — Adana to Mersin,

Stage 3
4 March 2018 — Mersin to Mersin,

Classification leadership table
In the 2018 Tour of Mediterrennean, three different jerseys were awarded for the main classifications. For the general classification, calculated by adding each cyclist's finishing times on each stage, the leader received a yellow jersey. This classification was considered the most important of the 2018 Tour of Mediterrennean, and the winner of the classification was considered the winner of the race.

Additionally, there was a points classification, which awarded a green jersey. In the points classification, cyclists received points for finishing in the top 15 in a mass-start stage. For winning a stage, a rider earned 15 points, with 14 for second, 13 for third, with a point fewer per place down to a single point for 15th place. Points towards the classification could also be accrued at intermediate sprint points during each stage. The winner of the intermediate sprint earned 6 points, with 4 for second and 2 for third. There was also a mountains classification, the leadership of which was marked by an orange jersey. In the mountains classification, points were won by reaching the top of a climb before other cyclists, with more points available for the higher-categorised climbs.

References

2018 UCI Europe Tour
2018 in Turkish sport